Jordi Font Mariné  (born 18 October 1955) is an Andorran politician. He is a member of the Social Democratic Party of Andorra.

External links
Page at the General Council of the Principality of Andorra

Members of the General Council (Andorra)
1955 births
Living people
Social Democratic Party (Andorra) politicians
Place of birth missing (living people)
21st-century Andorran politicians